Oleksandr Mykolayovych Kubrakov (born 20 August 1982) is a Ukrainian economist, civil servant and politician. Since 20 May 2021, he has served as Minister of Infrastructure of Ukraine.

Biography 
Kubrakov studied at the Kyiv National Economic University and completed a course in the Harvard Kennedy School.

Kubrakov was on a party list of the Servant of the People political party during the 2019 parliamentary elections, and was elected to the Verkhovna Rada (the Ukrainian parliament) in 2019. He surrendered his deputy mandate upon his appointment as a head of Ukravtodor on 3 December 2019.

On 15 November 2019 Kubrakov was determined the winner of the competition to assume the office of the chairperson of the State Agency for Motor Roads of Ukraine ("Ukrautodor")  and on 19 November 2019 he was appointed to this position by a Government of Ukraine

On 20 May 2021 Kubrakov was appointed to the position of Minister of Infrastructure of Ukraine.

On 14 August 2022 Kubrakov posted on his Facebook account that Ukraine are preparing delivery and will be delivering 23 thousand tons of wheat to Ethiopia via the ship named the "BRAVE COMMANDER".

Kubrakov was included to the Time 100 for the year 2022 published on 28 September 2022 ranking of one hundred people who are "changing the future of the world.

On 2 December 2022 the Shmyhal Government merged the Ministry of Infrastructure with the Ministry of Communities and Territories Development creating the Ministry of Development of Communities, Territories and Infrastructure; Kubrakov remained as head of the combined ministry.

Awards 
 Order of Merit, 3rd class (2022).

See also 
 Shmyhal Government
 List of members of the parliament of Ukraine, 2019–24

References

External links 

 

1982 births
Living people
People from Pershotravensk
Kyiv National Economic University alumni
21st-century Ukrainian economists
Ukrainian civil servants
Ninth convocation members of the Verkhovna Rada
Infrastructure ministers of Ukraine
Servant of the People (political party) politicians
Recipients of the Order of Merit (Ukraine), 3rd class
21st-century Ukrainian politicians